Prince Sultan Air Base  (PSAB) is a military air base located in the closed-city of Al Kharj, Saudi Arabia.

History

There was formerly a large United States presence there during Operations Southern Watch, Enduring Freedom and Iraqi Freedom.  The U.S. presence was predominantly that of multiple United States Air Force (USAF) flying units, augmented by a United States Navy (USN) or United States Marine Corps (USMC) Northrop Grumman EA-6B Prowler squadron, a Royal Air Force (RAF) fighter squadron with Panavia Tornado F.3s and a French Air Force fighter squadron with Dassault Mirage 2000s, Mirage F1 CR plus a Boeing C-135RF Stratotanker air refueling aircraft.  Following the attack on USAF facilities at Khobar Towers in Dharan in 1996, all USAF activities at that location were relocated to PSAB.

Before the September 11 attacks, per agreement with the Saudi Arabian government, all U.S. and Allied aircraft stationed at PSAB were to be of a "defensive" versus "offensive" nature.  This was due to Arab sensitivities that non-Royal Saudi Air Force (RSAF) aircraft in the Kingdom of Saudi Arabia should be perceived as being there for the defense of the Kingdom.

During Operation Southern Watch, this required aircraft carrying offensive strike ordnance for use against ground targets in Iraq to be stationed in Kuwait or aboard aircraft carriers in the Persian Gulf.  United States Air Force, United States Navy, United States Marine Corps, Royal Air Force, and French Air Force aircraft that were based at PSAB primarily consisted of airborne early warning, reconnaissance, air refueling, electronic warfare, suppression of enemy air defenses (SEAD) and air-to-air fighter aircraft, along with transient airlift aircraft.  U.S. squadrons came under the operational control of the, formerly 4404th Wing (Provisional), 363rd Air Expeditionary Wing (363 AEW) at PSAB, with associated squadrons or detachments prior to 11 Sep 2001 rotated in and out from their home bases in Europe, the United States or the Pacific on a 90-day to 6-month basis.  During Operation Southern Watch, in addition to Active Component aircraft, the USAF made extensive use of Air National Guard (ANG) and Air Force Reserve Command (AFRC) McDonnell Douglas F-15 Eagle, General Dynamics F-16 Fighting Falcon and Boeing KC-135 Stratotanker aircraft and associated personnel on rotational assignments to PSAB.  The United States Navy, Navy Reserve and United States Marine Corps also employed EA-6B aircraft from PSAB as well.

In August and early September 1998, Joint Task Force Southwest Asia (JTF-SWA) and its associated Coalition Air Operations Center (CAOC) were in the process of relocating from the Eskan Village complex in Riyadh to PSAB concurrent with construction of a more modern and expanded CAOC at PSAB. The 1996 Khobar Towers bombing accelerated this movement, so that subsequent command and control of all Coalition air operations for Operations Enduring Freedom and Iraqi Freedom were executed from PSAB, before 11 September 2001. 

During the War in Afghanistan, the Saudi government refused to allow the United States to use its air bases in Saudi Arabia to launch offensive air operations against the Islamic Emirate of Afghanistan and al-Qaeda, but did allow them to use Prince Sultan Air Base to coordinate offensive air operations of air combat operations launched from other countries. In mid-2003, all U.S. operations at PSAB began migrating to Al Udeid Air Base in Doha, Qatar. 
Between 2003 and 2005 Vickers VC10s from No. 101 Squadron RAF were based here in support of Operation Telic before moving to RAF Al Udeid (a section of the Al Udeid Air Base in Qatar).

In October 2019, 2,000 U.S. troops joined approximately 700 service members already stationed at the air base, along with deploying B-1B bombers, F-22 Raptor stealth fighters and Patriot missile batteries. The new troop buildup followed several attacks on oil tankers by Iran in the Gulf of Oman.

The 378th Air Expeditionary Wing was activated at Prince Sultan on 17 December 2019, with the Air Force stating the wing's mission is to 'provide strategic depth and increased defensive support while sustaining regional presence to promote peace through deterrence'.

Current use

 RSAF Wing 6:
 No. 18 Squadron RSAF with the Boeing E-3 Sentry Airborne Warning and Control System (AWACS) surveillance aircraft.
 No. 19 Squadron RSAF with the Beech Model 350 Super King Air and the Boeing RE-3A signals intelligence aircraft
 No. 23 Squadron RSAF with the Boeing KE-3A airborne refueller
 No. 24 Squadron RSAF with the Airbus A330-202 MRTT 
 No. 32 Squadron RSAF with the Lockheed KC-130H Hercules

Facilities

The base currently uses hundreds of tents as semi-temporary housing, though there are plans to have the tents replaced with trailers and more permanent structures.

The US Air Force  is responsible for pest management on base.

See also 

 List of military installations in Saudi Arabia

References

External links

 Prince Sultan Air Base at GlobalSecurity.org
 Prince Sultan Air Base at CNN
 Prince Sultan Air Base at AFCENT
 Prince Sultan Air Base at Defense Visual Information Distribution hub

Airports in Saudi Arabia
Royal Saudi Air Force
Military installations of Saudi Arabia
Installations of the United States Air Force in Saudi Arabia